Dieter Rexroth (born 1941) is a German musicologist and dramaturge.

Life and achievements 
Born in Dresden, Rexroth studied composition, conducting, musicology, German studies and philosophy at the universities of Cologne, Vienna and Bonn. In 1969 he received his doctorate in Bonn with a thesis on Arnold Schönberg.

From 1980 to 1994 he was also dramaturge at the Alte Oper in Frankfurt and co-founder of the "Frankfurter Feste", whose artistic director he was from 1986 to 1994. In 1995/1996 he developed an artistic event concept for St. Pölten as intendant of the Lower Austrian cultural scene.

From 1996 to 2006 he was intendant in the Deutsches Symphonie-Orchester Berlin of the "Rundfunkorchester und Chöre GmbH. In 2000 he brought the American conductor Kent Nagano to Berlin and became his dramaturgical consultant
. In 2000 he also became artistic director of the Young Euro Classic festival in Berlin and directed the "Kasseler Musiktage" from 2005 to 2015. Since 2013 he has been artistic director of the Felix Mendelssohn Bartholdy Prize, for which he conceptually focused on the promotion of the prizewinners, and chairman of the jury for composition.

Rexroth is the author and editor of publications on classical composers such as Ludwig van Beethoven, Anton Webern and Paul Hindemith as well as on contemporary composers such as Hans Werner Henze and Wolfgang Rihm.

Publications 
 Arnold Schönberg als Theoretiker der tonalen Harmonik. Dissertation. Bonn University 1969.
 Beethoven. Schott, Mainz among others 1982, . Taschenbuchausgabe: Goldmann, Munich 1982, .
 Museum. 175 Jahre Frankfurter Museums-Gesellschaft e.V. Frankfurter Museums-Gesellschaft, Frankfurt 1984.
 with Andres Briner, Giselher Schubert: Paul Hindemith. Leben und Werk in Bild und Text. Schott, Mainz 1988, .
 Beethovens Symphonien. Ein musikalischer Werkführer.<ref>[https://www.worldcat.org/oclc/57729912 Beethovens Symphonien. Ein musikalischer Werkführer] on WorldCat</ref> Beck, Munich 2005, .

Editorship:
 Erprobungen und Erfahrungen. Zu Paul Hindemith’s Schaffen in den zwanziger Jahren. Schott, Mainz 1978, 
 Zwischen den Grenzen. Zum Aspekt des Nationalen in der neuen Musik. Schott, Mainz 1979, .
 Paul Hindemith: Briefe. Fischer, Frankfurt 1982, .
 Opus Anton Webern. Quadriga, Berlin 1983, .
 Der Komponist Wolfgang Rihm. Schott, Mainz among others 1985, .
 Der Komponist Hans Werner Henze.'' Schott, Mainz among others 1986, .

References

External links 
 

Musicologists from Berlin
20th-century German musicologists
21st-century German musicologists
Dramaturges
1941 births
Living people
Writers from Dresden